The Live at Last Tour (also known as the Encore Tour in the summer of 2005) is the debut concert tour by American recording artist, Anastacia. The tour was in support of her third studio album, Anastacia (2004). The tour played over 80 shows in  Europe.

Setlist 

"Video Sequence"
"Seasons Change"
"Why'd You Lie to Me" 
"Sick and Tired"
"Secrets"
"Instrumental Sequence" (contains excerpts of "Sexy M.F.", "Play That Funky Music" and "Underdog")
"Not That Kind" / "Freak of Nature"
"Black Roses"
"You'll Never Be Alone"
"Heavy on My Heart"
"Welcome to My Truth"
"One Day in Your Life" (performed with audience members)
"Video Sequence" (contains excerpts from "Underground Army")
"Who's Gonna Stop The Rain" / "Overdue Goodbye"
"Video Sequence" (contains excerpts from "Time")
"Left Outside Alone"
"I Do"
Encore: 
"Paid My Dues"
"I'm Outta Love"

 
"Video Sequence"
"Seasons Change"
"Why'd You Lie To Me"
"Rearview"
"Sick And Tired"
"Secrets"
"Instrumental Sequence" (contains excerpts of "Sexy M.F.", "Play That Funky Music" and "Underdog")
"Not That Kind" / "Don'tcha Wanna" / "Freak of Nature"
"Black Roses"
"You'll Never Be Alone"
"Heavy on My Heart"
"Welcome to My Truth" 1
"One Day in Your Life" 
"Video Sequence" (contains excerpts from "Underground Army")
"Who's Gonna Stop The Rain" / "Overdue Goodbye" / "The Saddest Part"
"Video Sequence" (contains excerpts from "Time")
"Everything Burns"
"Left Outside Alone"
"I Do"
Encore: 
"Paid My Dues"
"I'm Outta Love"

1 Performed at select concerts

Tour dates

Live at Last Tour

Encore Tour

Festivals and other miscellaneous performances
Opern Air
Liverpool Summer Pops
Top of the Mountain Summer Concert
Romarock Festival
Festival de Nîmes
Monaco Red Cross Ball
Smukfest

Cancellations and rescheduled shows

Broadcasts and recordings

The DVD features footage from her Berlin and Munich concerts of the Fall 2004 leg of the tour.  It omits the song One Day in Your Life (performed as a duet between two audience members) for unexplained reasons .  Along with the concert, the DVD also contains a documentary. It includes interviews with Anastacia along with music videos to five unreleased songs from Anastacia: 
"Underground Army"
"I Do"
"Rearview"
"Seasons Change" 
"Time" (Video Remix)
along with the music videos of:
"Left Outside Alone" (US Version)
"Everything Burns" 
"Pieces Of A Dream"
"I Belong to You"

Other special features include performances of "Rearview", "One Day in Your Life" and "The Saddest Part" from the "Encore Tour". The DVD was not released in North America which came as a huge disappointment to fans.

Personnel

Live at Last 2004
Band
 Music Director & lead guitar:  Rob Bacon
 Guitar: Michael "Fish" Herring
 Bass: Robert "JJ" Smith
 Keyboards: Michael Bluestein
 Drums: Chris "CJ" Johnson

Backup singers
 Dee Dee Foster
 Cindy Mizelle
 Lisa Vaughn

Dancers
 Shana Lord
 Jon Cruz
 Raistalla
 Michael Cothren Pena

Live at Last (2005)
Band
 Lead guitar: Rob Bacon
 Guitar: Yogi Lonich
 Bass: Robert "JJ" Smith
 Keyboards: Michael Bluestein
 Drums: Chris "CJ" Johnson

Backup singers
 Dee Dee Foster
 Cindy Mizelle
 Brandon Rogers

Dancers
 Shana Lord
 Jon Cruz
 Yayoi Ito
 Michael Cothren Pena

The Encore Tour
Band
 Lead guitar: Tony Bruno
 Guitar: Yogi Lonich
 Bass: Robert "JJ" Smith
 Keyboards: Michael Bluestein
 Drums: Chris "CJ" Johnson

Backup singers
 Dee Dee Foster
 Cindy Mizelle
 Brandon Rogers

Dancers
 Shana Lord
 Jon Cruz
 Yayoi Ito
 Jose Cueva

References

External links
Anastacia's Official Site

2004 concert tours
2005 concert tours
Anastacia concert tours